"Never Ride", is a Hip hop single by South African producer Mashbeatz from his third  studio album THIS IS RELIGION, the single features the likes of Maglera Doe Boy & Thato Saul. It became a sleeper hit; going viral on a video sharing platform TikTok a week after its release.

Commercial performance 
Following the single going viral the song was featured on Spotify commercials, the visualizer surpassed 1 million views on YouTube in a month, which led fans debating over the song should have a remix or not, and so Mashbeatz felt that it was adequate to release the remix of the song.

Charts

Certification and sales

Awards and nominations

Remix 

On the 9th of September 2022, the anticipated remix of "Never Ride" from the producer Mashbeatz was released through digital platforms with its music video premiering the same day on YouTube. The remix features vocals from 25K, Anzo, Buzzi Lee, LucasRaps, Maglera Doe Boy, Roii, Saudi, Sjava, Thato Saul, YoungstaCPT & Wordz.

References

External links 

2022 singles
2022 songs